Soledad Sosa (born c. 1986) is an Argentine politician of the Workers' Party who served as a deputy elected in Mendoza Province from 2015 to 2017.  She held the post by rotation for the Workers' Left Front, taking over from Nicolas del Caño in December 2015.

References

21st-century Argentine women politicians
21st-century Argentine politicians
Living people
People from Mendoza Province
Workers' Party (Argentina) politicians
1980s births
Members of the Argentine Chamber of Deputies elected in Mendoza